Indian Telly Award for Best Child Artiste - Female is an award given by Indiantelevision.com as part of its annual Indian Telly Awards for TV serials, to recognize a female actor who has delivered an outstanding performance on television.

The award was first awarded in 2003 under the title TV Child Artiste of the Year for a performance by either sex.  Next year, it was officially divided into two separate categories to acknowledge both male and female actors individually.

Superlatives

List of winners

Child Artiste of the Year 
2001 Not Awarded
2002 Not Awarded
2003 Hansika Motwani - Des Mein Niklla Hoga Chand as Tina 
Mausami - Kyunki Saas Bhi Kabhi Bahu Thi as Saawari
Swapnali Kulkarni - Kasautii Zindagii Kay as Kuki
Tanvi Hegde - Sonpari as Frooty
Male nominees

Child Artiste - Female 

2004 Shriya Sharma - Kasautii Zindagii Kay as Sneha 
Tanvi Hegde - Sonpari as Frooty
Hansika Motwani - Des Mein Niklla Hoga Chand as Tina 
Akshita Garud - Kumkum – Ek Pyara Sa Bandhan as Roshini
Richa Bhadra - Khichdi as Chakki
2005 Chinky Jaiswal - Kyunki Saas Bhi Kabhi Bahu Thi as Bhoomi 
Tanvi Hegde - Sonpari as Frooty 
Shriya Sharma - Kasautii Zindagii Kay as Sneha 
Chinky Jaiswal - Kkusum as Simi
2006 Swini Khara - Baa Bahoo Aur Baby as Chaitali Thakkar 
Chinky Jaiswal  - Dharti Ka Veer Yodha Prithviraj Chauhan as Vedika
Chinky Jaiswal  - Jassi Jaissi Koi Nahin as Preetha
Khushi Dubey - Kaisa Ye Pyar Hai as Sur
2007 Swini Khara - Baa Bahoo Aur Baby as Chaitali Thakkar 
Rudrakshi - Kasautii Zindagii Kay as Kanishta
Rudrakshi - Kayamath as Prachi
Chinky Jaiswal  - Durgesh Nandinii as Nikita
Benazir Shaikh - Agadam Bagdam Tigdam as Sonia Malhotra
2008 Avika Gor - Balika Vadhu as Anandi 
Khushi Dubey - Naaginn - Waadon Ki Agniparikshaa as Amrita
Ishita Panchal - Woh Rehne Waali Mehlon Ki as Rani
Ahsaas Channa - Kasamh Se as Ganga
Swini Khara - Baa Bahoo Aur Baby as Chaitali Thakkar
2009 Avika Gor - Balika Vadhu as Anandi
Ishita Panchal - Uttaran as Tapasya
Sparsh Khanchandani - Uttaran as Ichchha
Zaynah Vastani - Aapki Antara as Antara
Akshita Rajput - Bandini as Mongi
2010 Ulka Gupta - Jhansi Ki Rani as Manu 
Avika Gor - Balika Vadhu as Anandi 
Prachi Deshmukh - Tere Liye as Tani
Reem Sheikh - Neer Bhare Tere Naina Devi as Devi
Saloni Daini - Comedy Circus – Maha Sangram as Saloni
2011 No Award
2012 Aanchal Munjal - Parvarrish – Kuchh Khattee Kuchh Meethi as   aka Raave Ahuja
Sparsh Khanchandani - Parvarrish – Kuchh Khattee Kuchh Meethi as Raashi Ahuja
Jannat Zubair Rehmani - Phulwa as Phulwa
Khusali Hirani - Haar Jeet as Mahika
Palak Jain - Veer Shivaji as Rani Saibai
2013 Amrita Mukherjee - Bade Achhe Lagte Hain as Pihu Ram Kapoor  
Harishita Ojha - Ek Veer Ki Ardaas...Veera as  Veera Kaur Sampooran Singh
Ahsaas Channa - Devon Ke Dev...Mahadev as Ashok Sundari
Ashnoor Kaur - Na Bole Tum Na Maine Kuch Kaha as Navika Mohan Bhatnagar
Palak Dey - Punar Vivah as Palak Yash Sindhia
 2014 Ruhanika Dhawan - Yeh Hai Mohabbatein as Ruhi Raman Bhalla
Harshita Ojha - Ek Veer Ki Ardaas...Veera as Veera
Roshni Walia - Bharat Ka Veer Putra – Maharana Pratap as Ajabde Punwar
Drishti Hemdev - Pavitra Bandhan as Misthi
 2015 Ruhana Khanna - Gangaa as Gangaa 
Ruhanika Dhawan - Yeh Hai Mohabbatein as Ruhi Raman Bhalla
Spandan Chaturvedi - Udaan as Chakor
2019 Aakriti Sharma - Kullfi Kumar Bajewala as Kulfi

See also 

 Indian Telly Award for Best Child Artiste - Male

References

Indian Telly Awards
Awards for actresses